Rudak (also Romanized as Rūdak) is a village in Sagezabad Rural District, in the Central District of Buin Zahra County, Qazvin Province, Iran. At the 2006 census, its population was 1,556, in 398 families.

References 

Populated places in Buin Zahra County